SOULmate is the fifth and final album by Canadian R&B/soul band jacksoul, released in 2009. It was released shortly after the death of Haydain Neale. All proceeds from the sales of the album will go to the Haydain Neale Family Trust.

Track listing
 "Lonesome Highway"  	
 "How We Do"
 "All You Need" 	
 "Lion Heart"
 "This Is Heaven" 	
 "911"
 "I Surrender"
 "It's You"
 "Do It to Me"
 "You're Beautiful"

References

2009 albums
Jacksoul albums